Sebastian Jakubiak (born 21 June 1993) is a German professional footballer who plays as a midfielder for Septemvri Sofia.

Club career
Jakubiak played for local side VfB Lübeck, for the FC St. Pauli reserves and German fourth-tier outfit SV Rödinghausen before moving abroad to play for Eredivisie club Heracles in summer 2017.

On 2 December 2017, Jakubiak scored only 13 seconds into his debut and with his first touch for the Dutch side against Willem II.

Career statistics

Honours
1. FC Magdeburg
3. Liga: 2021–22

References

External links
 Profile - Voetbal International
 
 

1993 births
Living people
Sportspeople from Lübeck
Association football midfielders
German footballers
3. Liga players
Regionalliga players
Eredivisie players
VfB Lübeck players
FC St. Pauli II players
SV Rödinghausen players
Heracles Almelo players
1. FC Magdeburg players
German expatriate footballers
Expatriate footballers in the Netherlands
German expatriate sportspeople in the Netherlands
Footballers from Schleswig-Holstein